Rhamma is a Neotropical genus of butterfly in the family Lycaenidae.

Species
partial
Rhamma adunca (Draudt, 1921)
Rhamma amethystina (Hayward, 1950)
Rhamma arria (Hewitson, 1870)
Rhamma aurugo (Draudt, 1921)
Rhamma bilix (Draudt, 1921)
Rhamma commodus (Felder & Felder, 1865)
Rhamma confusa (Lathy, 1936)
Rhamma hybla (Druce, 1907)
Rhamma mishma (Hewitson, 1878)
Rhamma oxida (Hewitson, 1870)
Rhamma tyrrius (Druce, 1907)

References

Eumaeini
Lycaenidae of South America
Lycaenidae genera